Boaty McBoatface (also known as Boaty) is the British lead boat in a fleet of three robotic lithium battery–powered autonomous underwater vehicles (AUVs) of the Autosub Long Range (ALR) class. Launched in 2017 and carried on board the polar scientific research vessel RRS Sir David Attenborough, she is a focal point of the Polar Explorer Programme of the UK Government.

Boaty and her two fleet-mates are part of the UK National Marine Equipment Pool and owned by the National Oceanography Centre in Southampton.  She is classified as an "autosub long range (ALR) autonomous underwater vehicle", and will use her onboard sensors to map the movement of deep waters that play a vital role in regulating the Earth's climate.

Naming

The name Boaty McBoatface was originally proposed in a March 2016 #NameOurShip online poll to name the £200 million polar scientific research ship being constructed in the Cammell Laird shipyard in Birkenhead for the United Kingdom's Natural Environment Research Council (NERC). BBC Radio Jersey presenter James Hand coined the humorous suggestion Boaty McBoatface for the poll, and the name quickly became the most popular choice, with 124,109 votes. The name was described as a homage to Hooty McOwlface, an owl named through an "Adopt-a-Bird" programme in 2012 that became popular on the Internet.

Although Boaty McBoatface  was the most popular suggestion in the #NameOurShip poll, the suggestion to use the name for the mothership was not followed. In October 2016, Jo Johnson, Minister for Universities and Science, announced that the ship would be named Sir David Attenborough, after the eminent English zoologist and broadcaster, who came fifth in the poll. The name Boaty McBoatface, despite receiving more than ten times the number of votes of Sir David Attenborough, was assigned to one of the submersibles deployed aboard the RRS Sir David Attenborough instead. Describing it as an "eloquent compromise", Duncan Wingham told the Commons Science and Technology Committee, "The controversy over the naming of a new polar research vessel was an 'astoundingly good outcome for public interest in science, and "the row had 'put a smile' on people's faces" after attracting huge public interest.

Observers of contemporary culture coined the term "McBoatfacing", defined as "making the critical mistake of letting the internet decide things". In one such observation, Jennifer Finney Boylan of The New York Times wrote that to be "McBoatfaced" was to allow people to "deliberately make their choices not in order to foster the greatest societal good, but, instead, to mess with you". The results of the poll inspired numerous similar spoofs in other naming polls.

Service
Boaty underwent advanced sea trials in 2016.

Missions
Combined with measurements collected by RRS James Clark Ross, the data suggest that as winds over the Southern Ocean have strengthened, driven by the hole in the ozone layer above Antarctica, and increases in greenhouse gases, they have increased the turbulence of deep ocean waters, leading to increased mixing of cold and warm water. According to National Oceanography Centre oceanographer Dr Eleanor Frajka-Williams, "This was the unique new process that rapidly exchanges water between the cold and the warm and then spreads the effect of the different water properties over a larger area", more efficiently than the better-known processes that mix warm surface waters with cold water from the deep sea. This action rapidly warms the cold water, which contributes to rising sea levels, as water becomes less dense as it warms. This newly discovered action has not yet been included in models for predicting sea level rise and the effect of climate change on the ocean. The results were published in the Proceedings of the National Academy of Sciences.

A subsequent voyage for Boaty in 2017 was in the North Sea. Fitted with new chemical and acoustic sensors, these will enable Boaty to seek, or 'sniff out' traces indicating the artificial release of gas from beneath the seabed. This will be part of a world first 'real world' controlled experiment in deep-water, in order to simulate any potential release of gas that may be indicative of leakage from a carbon capture and storage reservoir; and will be led by the NOC.

Following on from her North Sea exploits, Boaty will head north in a major technical challenge, and attempt the first ever under-ice crossing of the Arctic Ocean.

Starting March 2017, Boaty will also provide a package of online educational resources, primarily for teachers in low-attaining primary and secondary schools, as an aid to improving learning in STEM (science, technology, engineering and mathematics) subjects for pupils. This material from Boaty will also be made available to the general public.

During January and February 2018, Boaty completed her first mission under-ice. She was deployed in the southern section of the Weddell Sea, spending a total of 51 hours under the Antarctic ice.

On 3 November 2020, Boaty headed for the open seas to start trials before a scheduled trip to Antarctica in 2021 for climate change research.

References

External links
RRS James Clark Ross — temporary initial mothership of 'Boaty's' maiden voyage, at the British Antarctic Survey (BAS)
RRS Sir David Attenborough — future permanent mothership of 'Boaty', at the British Antarctic Survey (BAS)
Autosubs — at the National Oceanography Centre (NOC)
One explanation of the X-y McX-face style of meme — at Slate

2016 in the United Kingdom
Autonomous underwater vehicles
Research vessels of the United Kingdom
British Antarctic Survey
Internet memes introduced in 2016